St. Joseph is a township in the Canadian province of Ontario, the largest of four municipalities on St. Joseph Island. It had a population of 1,240 in the Canada 2016 Census.

The mayor of the township is Jody Wildman.

Communities
The township's main population centre is Richards Landing. It also includes the smaller communities of Harmony and Sailors Encampment.

Richards Landing
The hamlet of Richards Landing has a view of the Highway 548 bridge at the pier on the northern tip of town.  Highway 548 leads through the centre of the town and is its main thoroughfare.  "The Landing" is St. Joseph Island's business centre, offering a grocery store, liquor/beer store, gift shops and galleries, restaurants, accommodation, marina/boat re-fuelling, 24-hour Emergency Department/hospital, medical centre, pharmacy and physiotherapy (physical therapy) clinic, bank, parks, public swimming, beach and tennis courts, variety store and movie rentals.

Demographics 

See also
List of townships in Ontario

References

External links

Municipalities in Algoma District
Single-tier municipalities in Ontario
St. Joseph Island (Ontario)
Township municipalities in Ontario